The 1913 Minnesota Golden Gophers football team represented the University of Minnesota in the 1913 college football season. In their 14th year under head coach Henry L. Williams, the Golden Gophers compiled a 5–2 record (2–1 against Western Conference opponents), finished in second place in the conference, and outscored their opponents by a combined total of 116 to 32.

Fullback Clark Shaughnessy and end Lorin Solon were named All-Americans by the Associated Press.  Shaughnessy and Solon were also named All-Big Ten.

Schedule

References

Minnesota
Minnesota Golden Gophers football seasons
Minnesota Golden Gophers football